The Niagara Falls convention was a meeting of twenty-nine men, held at the Erie Beach Hotel, Fort Erie, Ontario, on the Canadian side of the  Niagara River, from July 11 until 14 July 1905. It was the first meeting of The Niagara Movement, a group of African-Americans, led by W. E. B. Du Bois, John Hope, and William Monroe Trotter. Instrumental in forming the National Association for the Advancement of Colored People. The subsequent Niagara Conference was held the following year at Storer College, Harpers Ferry, West Virginia.

External links
The Niagara Movement founded

1905 in Canada
1905 conferences
African-American history of New York (state)
1905 in Ontario